Idar Nordby Lysgård (born 25 September 1994) is a Norwegian football goalkeeper who plays for Åsane.

He hails from Eina and played youth football for Ihle and Raufoss. In 2012 he got his senior debut for Skeid, first in the cup and then once in the league. The team was languishing on the fourth tier at the time, but advanced to the third, and Lysgård became the first-choice goalkeeper.

After the 2017 season he was picked up by Kongsvinger, but did not play and returned to Skeid, first on loan and then permanently. He played two more seasons with Skeid, being relegated from the second tier in 2019 and narrowly missing re-promotion through a playoff loss in 2020. In 2021 he joined first-tier club Mjøndalen. Benched the 22 first games, he became the first choice after Mjøndalen's 0–7 loss to Haugesund.

References

1994 births
Living people
People from Vestre Toten
Norwegian footballers
Skeid Fotball players
Kongsvinger IL Toppfotball players
Mjøndalen IF players
Norwegian First Division players
Eliteserien players
Association football goalkeepers
Sportspeople from Innlandet